Chery Automobile Co. Ltd., trading as Chery and sometimes known by the pinyin transcription of its Chinese name, Qirui, is a Chinese state-owned automobile manufacturer headquartered in Wuhu, Anhui, China. Founded in 1997, it is currently the ninth largest automobile manufacturer in China, with 1,232,727 vehicles produced in 2022.

Chery's principal products are passenger cars, minivans, and SUVs; it sells passenger cars under the Chery marque and commercial vehicles under the Karry brand.
 
Chery began the production of automobiles in 1999 and their export from China in 2001. It has been China's largest passenger car exporter since 2003, and in 2011 exported around 25% of its total production. It operates Qoros formed in 2007, a 50:50 joint venture with Kenon Holdings, for selling a range of premium vehicles in emerging markets. In 2012, Jaguar Land Rover formed a 50:50 joint venture with Chery dubbed Chery Jaguar Land Rover for the production of Jaguar and Land Rover cars in China.

Since 2002, Chery has been the top exporter of Chinese brand passenger vehicles, with 451,337 vehicles exported in 2022. Chery owned and operated vehicle assembly and component manufacturing facilities in mainland China, and many of its vehicles are assembled overseas for export markets—primarily in factories not owned by the company that use either complete or semicomplete knock-down kits. It has two domestic R&D centers and invests around 7% of its total revenues in product development.

History

1997 to 2010

Chery was founded in 1997 as a state-owned enterprise by a group of officials from Anhui province and began automobile production in 1999 using a chassis licensed from Volkswagen's SEAT Toledo. Called the Fengyun, Chery's first car sold nearly 30,000 units.

The Wall Street Journal has described Chery's corporate culture as "an odd hybrid of Communist state enterprise and entrepreneurial start-up", and entrepreneurial risk-taking is evident in its early history. Initial production was technically illegal as the company was only awarded a passenger car production license in 2003, so while its first product rolled off the line in December 1999, it could not be legally sold until 2001. In that year, Chery solved the problem by piggybacking on a SAIC Motor license, which it did until 2003. Perhaps the 20% ownership stake in Chery that SAIC once held was compensation for this early favor, but the ownership was soon sold due to rising tensions between Chery and another SAIC partner, General Motors. GM is not the only foreign partner of SAIC to have been exasperated with Chery; Volkswagen claims Chery was using tooling from an old VW factory to produce a model that resembled a Jetta circa 2003.

In the late 2000s, Chery began to actively seek a partnership with a foreign automaker, a hallmark of major Chinese car makers. Tie-ups with both Chrysler and Fiat were touted, but fell through. In 2007, Chrysler planned a cooperation with Chery that would have seen the Chery A1 sold as a Dodge-brand car in the US and abroad. The plan would have quickly increased the Chrysler small car stable, and the two companies participated in a signing ceremony in late 2007. In early 2008, a similar deal was reached between Chrysler and Nissan, however, and the Chrysler-Chery cooperation was abandoned. Around the time of the 2009 Chrysler Chapter 11 reorganization, Chrysler discussed the possibility of an asset sale with Chery.

In 2007, Fiat and Chery signed a memorandum of understanding for the creation of a car-making joint venture. Intended to begin operations in 2009, it was to manufacture Fiat and Alfa Romeo-branded products for the Chinese market and be located in Wuhu. The deal was put on hold in March 2009. As of 2012, Fiat produces in China with local partner GAC Group.

Qoros, a car-making joint venture between Chery and Singapore-based Kenon Holdings, was established in 2007.

In October 2009, Chery announced plans for an assembly plant in Turkey to be built in cooperation with the Turkish automaker Mermerler Otomotiv at a cost of $500 million. The plant is planned to have an initial capacity of 20,000 units per year, rising to 100,000 by 2017. As of 2012, the plant has yet to commence production. When it comes online, this production base will add to a handful of joint venture factories that Chery has in places like Argentina and Iran. These stand in contrast to a number of factories outside China that assemble Chery vehicles, but in which Chery does not have an ownership stake.

In 2009, Chery produced 508,500 units, and at this time, it had an annual production capacity around 650,000 units. More than 400,000 of its 2009 sales were sedans. Production capacity figures may consider engines and vehicles as discrete.

2010 to present
Chery became the seventh-most productive Chinese vehicle manufacturer in 2010 by selling nearly 700,000 units. Slipping sales marked 2011 and 2012; in these years, the company produced more than 640,000 and near 590,000 units, respectively, and it moved from a seventh to a tenth-place ranking. This decrease may be due to Chery's manufacturing mix being significantly different from those of other, major Chinese automakers; the company does make commercial vehicles, but SUVs comprise only 14% of its product line.

An agreement with Tata Motors was struck in March 2012 to produce Jaguar Land Rover models in China. In 2013, a Tata executive stated that this deal was "still on track", and some expect the planned production base to start output in 2014.

In June 2012, plans to build a production base in Malaysia were announced, and as of July 2012, this project is proceeding without a local partner. The planned factory will have a production capacity of 10,000 units per year.

After having introduced the Karry, Rely, and Riich subbrands in 2009, its sprawling production policy and lineup became a problem for Chery. With over 100 new models in the works, Chery decided in the fall of 2012 to cancel the Rely and Riich brands and to narrow its focus. As of 2012, 30 new models are planned a significant reduction from the prior future lineup.

In 2018, Chery sold 50% of its stocks in Brazil to CAOA group.

In 2020, there were plans for Chinese auto maker Chery to buy a percentage of Tata Motors in order for Chery to gain entry into the Indian market and in order for Tata Motors to get technology for cars such as the proposed Tata Blackbird. However, due to COVID-19 and the continuing political tensions over the Chinese/Indian border it is highly unlikely that these plans will go ahead anytime soon.

In 2022, Chery entered the Mexican market under the Chirey brand. Other markets entered in 2022 included Australia, Malaysia, and Indonesia.

Operations
Chery's main production base in the mainland of China is located in Anhui. As of 2007, the company had two auto-making production bases, two engine-making facilities, and a transmission production plant. Another car-making production base located in Dalian, Liaoning province, became operational in 2012.

Chery invests around 7% of its total sales in research and development, and, as of 2011, had over 4,000 patents. It has R&D facilities in Wuhu, Anhui province, and Changshu, Jiangsu province.

Overseas markets
A number of factories in developing countries manufacture Chery vehicles from either complete or semi-complete knock-down kits. With the exception of an Argentine cooperation, and an Iranian factory, these are not owned by Chery. As of the beginning of 2012, 13 operational factories produced Chery vehicles and an additional three were in development.

These factories have appeared in Egypt, Indonesia, Iran, Malaysia, the Middle East, North Africa, Pakistan, Uruguay, Russia, Taiwan, Thailand, Ukraine, Venezuela and Vietnam.

Brazil
Chery has a production base in Jacarei, Brazil, that began construction in July 2011, in a joint effort with the government of the state of São Paulo. The plant began operating in August 2014, with a first-phase production capacity of 50,000 units per year. In phase two, the plant will achieve an annual production capacity of 150,000 units. The models produced there have been the hybrid-powered Celer (since October 2014), the QQ (since the second half of 2015), Tiggo 2 (since mid-2017) and Arrizo 5 (since October 2018).

In 2017, the  bought 51% of the company by taking control and now naming it as Caoa Chery. Its local partner Caoa has been producing the Tiggo 4 in Anápolis, Goiás, in knock-down kit form, since November 2018.

Egypt

Assembly of Chery cars from complete knock-down kits began in Egypt in 2004 according to the company itself, but news reports indicate that it only expressed initial interest in doing so that year. As of 2011, some Chery models may be sold here under the brand name Speranza. One Egyptian factory making Chery models from semi-complete knock-down kits had a 2009 production capacity of 30,000 vehicles/year.
 
In 2011, Chery stated the parts localization ratio for Egypt was 45%.

Indonesia
In this country, Chery models have been assembled from knock-down kits since 2006 until 2011, and since 2022.

Iran
Manufacture from kits in Iran dates from as early as 2004. In late 2007, Chery stated that it held a minority ownership in a joint venture with Iranian Khodro and Canadian Solitac as its partners. This JV controlled a knock-down factory in Babol, Mazandaran. Making a QQ6 renamed the S21, it may be sold both inside and outside Iran. and carry a brand name other than Chery, as well. Tiggo5 and Arrizo5 cars are being sold as Chery brand in Iran. Modiran Vehicle Manufacturing Company also manufactures Chery vehicles in Iran.

Malaysia
A small facility may have become operational around 2004, and by 2008, a factory assembling Chery models from kits opened in Johor Bahru, Johor. As of 2012, another factory is expected to be built and operational in Malaysia by 2015.

Myanmar
As of May 2011, a 3,000 to 5,000 unit/year production facility is planned in the country. As of 2012, the Chery QQ is apparently popular in Yangon.

Pakistan
Chery has entered into a manufacturing and licensing agreement with Ghandhara Industries Limited.

Taiwan
The Chery A3 is assembled since August 2009 in Taichung, Taiwan, by Shengrong Auto, a subsidiary of Prince Motors, a Taiwanese car company.

Turkey
A production site was planned to be raised in the province of Sakarya, in a collaboration with the local Chery dealer, Mermerler Otomotiv.

Ukraine

Chery has had a partnership with ZAZ since 2006 and manufactures cars from kits at sites in Zaporizhzhia and Chornomorsk. Since February 2011, the Chery A13 has been manufactured in Ukraine, where it is rebadged and sold in the country as a ZAZ Forza.

Venezuela
First introduced to this country in mid-2006, Chery vehicles continued to be the only licensed Chinese car exports to Venezuela as of 2011, according to the company. Opened in September 2011, a new Chery production site in the north-central state of Aragua, owned by the ZGT joint venture, produces the A1 and A3 models.

Former factories

Russia
In Russia, Avtotor produced Chery models from kits from 2006 to 2008. TagAZ also produced Chery vehicles, from 2008 to 2014, but these usually carried non-Chery badges such as "Vortex".

Uruguay
Between 2007 and 2015, the Argentinian company SOCMA Group manufactured Chery vehicles in the Oferol factory in Barra de Carrasco, Canelones, Uruguay. The Tiggo was officially launched in Uruguay in October 2007. The plant was permanently closed as of May 2015.

Current products
Chery makes cars and SUVs. The parts used in their manufacture may be foreign designed, and some may be imported; Chery has cooperative agreements with many foreign component firms, including the American ArvinMeritor, American Autoliv, American Delphi Automotive, the Australian company Futuris, German Robert Bosch GmbH, American PPG Industries, German Siemens VDO, French Valeo, and the American Visteon. Some have helped Chery establish a local supply chain.

Chery

QQ 

 Chery QQ Ice Cream (2021–present)

Tiggo 

Chery Tiggo 3/Tiggo (2005–present)
 Chery Tiggo 7 (2016–present)
 Chery Tiggo 3x (2016–present)
 Chery Tiggo 5x (2017–present)
 Chery Tiggo 8 (2018–present)
 Chery Tiggo 9 (2023–present)

Arrizo 

 Chery Arrizo 5/Arrizo 5 Pro/Arrizo EX (2016–present)
 Chery Arrizo 5 Plus/Arrizo GX (2018–present)
 Chery Arrizo 8 (2022–present)

Omoda 

 Chery Omoda 5 (2022–present)

eQ 
 Chery eQ1 (2017–present)
 Chery eQ2 (2018–present)
 Chery eQ5 (2021–present)
 Chery Wujie Pro (2022–present)

Starway 
 Chery Starway E03 (2023–present)

Karry 

Karry is a brand for light commercial vehicles.

Exeed

Exeed is a premium brand for crossovers and SUVs.
Exeed TX
Exeed TXL (Lingyun)
Exeed LX (Zhuifeng)
Exeed VX (Lanyue)
Exeed Yaoguang

Jetour

Jetour is a budget brand for crossovers and SUVs.
Jetour Dasheng/Dashing
Jetour X70
Jetour X70S	
Jetour X70 Coupe
Jetour X70 Plus	
Jetour X90
Jetour X90 Plus
Jetour X95
Jetour T-1 (Traveller)

Former products

Chery 

 Chery A11 (1999–2006)
 Chery A15  (2003–2010)
 Chery Eastar (2006–2016)
 Chery A5 (2006–2010)
 QQ6 (2006–2010)
 Karry Youyi (Chery A18) (2006–2013)
 Chery A1 (2007–2015)
 Chery QQme  (2009–2011)
 Chery Cowin 1 – facelifted Chery QQ6 (2010–2013)
 Chery Cowin 3 – facelifted Chery A5 (2010–2013)
 Chery Cowin 2 – facelifted Chery A15 (2010–2016)
 Chery Q22/Q22B (2011–2012)
 Chery X5 (2011–2015)
 Chery Cowin 5 - facelifted Chery Eastar (2012–2013)
 Chery S22 (2006–2016)
 Chery V5/Eastar5 (2006–2015)
 Chery A3 (2008–2015)
 Chery A13 (Fulwin 2) (2009–2015)
 Chery Q21 (2009-)
 Chery E3 (2013–2015)
 Chery E5 (2011–2016)
 Chery E8 (Eastar II) (2012–2016)
 Chery Arrizo 7 (2013–2018)
 Chery A13 (2008–2019)
 Chery Arrizo 3 (2015–2020)
 Chery Tiggo 5 (2013–2021)

Rely
Rely was Chery's brand focused on premium commercial vehicles. It was discontinued in 2012.
Rely H3	
Rely H5	
Rely V5
Rely X5

Riich 

Riich was discontinued in 2012.

Riich R2 (2007–2009)
Riich G5 (codename A6) — 2.0T (2009–2013)
Riich M1 (codename S18) — city car of which an EV-version also exists (2009–2014)
Riich X1 – SUV (2009–2014)
Riich G6 (2010–2015)
Riich G3 (2011–2014)

Concepts 
2005 M14
 2007 T15
 2007 B12
 2008 P12
 2008 F11
 2008 B22
 2008 Faira
 B14 (as coupe/convertible)
 G6
 Ant
 Ant 2.0
 2014 Chery Beta 5 Concept
 2014 Chery Concept
 2017 Chery Tiggo Coupe Concept

Other products

Engines
The company makes and has exported engines under the brands ACTECO and CAC. Chery engines have been bought by Fiat and exported to the US.

Joint ventures 
Chery operates car-making joint ventures with Jaguar Land Rover and Israel Corporation, and automotive component-manufacturing joint ventures with Arvin Meritor, Johnson Controls, and PPG Industries.

Chery Jaguar Land Rover

In March 2012, Chery and the UK-based luxury automaker Jaguar Land Rover agreed to invest an initial US$2.78 billion in a new China-based joint venture that will sell and manufacture Jaguar and Land Rover vehicles and engines, as well as establish a research and development facility and create a new "own-brand" automobile marque. The joint venture received regulatory approval in September 2012. An initial production base will be built in Changshu, a county-level city close to Shanghai.

In 2013 Chery began manufacturing a redesigned MOKE revival. The design evokes the classic Mini Moke built from 1964 until 1993.

Qoros

Its first car-making joint venture with a foreign firm, Qoros was established by Chery in cooperation with Israel Corporation in 2007, and planned to begin sales in 2013. Set to unveil a sedan atop a brand-new platform at the 2013 Shanghai Auto Show, Qoros' debut models will not be electric vehicles (as some sources may have reported). A proposed production base for the venture will be built in Changshu, Jiangsu province, and become operational in 2012. Production capacity will be 150,000 units a year, but the location may not run at full capacity until 2015 or 2016. While Qoros professes its desire to sell to young city dwellers in China and Europe, The company does have plans to include electric vehicles in its lineup.

Higher-end Qoros cars are built with components and systems from foreign suppliers such as American Visteon and French Valeo. Its engine design also required assistance from a foreign firm, and Qoros has attracted western talent including former employees of Volkswagen and Mini. It has sites in Austria and Germany as of 2012.

Although initially known as Chery Quantum Auto Co Ltd, its legal name is now Qoros Auto Co Ltd. The eponymous brand name sounds like the English word "chorus".

Sales

Chery has been the top Chinese auto exporter since 2003, and many of its exports may be in the form of knock-down kits destined for overseas assembly. The fact that, prior to 2012, it lacked a joint venture with an established western automaker may explain its export focus; a 2009 report by the US Congressional Research Service asserted that such joint ventures, commonplace in the Chinese auto industry, restrained overseas sales.

Making its first export to Syria in 2001, as of 2010 Chery was the top exporter among Chinese automakers, a title it held since 2003. Many of these exports may be in the form of knock-down kits. One of Chery's strategic goals is to expand in developing countries first and then in developed countries.

Selling in several other continents besides, Chery dealerships exist in Russia, Ukraine, Belarus, Iran, Serbia, Macedonia, Turkey and Italy through the DR Motor Company. Other notable nations where Chery models are on offer as of 2016 include Argentina, Australia, Brazil, Chile, Colombia, Venezuela, New Zealand, Singapore, and South Africa. In Ukraine, Chery models are sold by UkrAVTO Corp, and partner firms operate sales outlets in other markets as well. In some nations, companies Chery cooperates with build models in their own small factories.

As of early 2011, the Tiggo was Chery's most popular model in export markets. Chery launched Jetour in United Arab Emirates on 2021 and partnered up with The Elite Cars and since then a stable demand for Jetour SUV is seen on the market.

Motorsport
Chery participated in the Dakar Rally in 2010 and 2011, racing with Rely X5 SUVs in both editions.

Safety record
An informal, 2007 Russian crash test yielded a poor score for a Chery model named the Amulet.

Some Chery models have received good marks for safety, however. In 2009, the A3 received a five-star safety rating in the Chinese new-car-safety tests, C-NCAP, becoming the first indigenous car to achieve such a high-test rating. The Chery Riich G3 has also been awarded a five-star rating.

Controversies

Copying claims

In June 2003 American company General Motors sued Chery accusing it of copying the first generation Daewoo Matiz (developed by a GM subsidiary, GM Daewoo) in its design for the Chery QQ. General Motors also claimed a disguised Matiz was used in a crash test in place of the Chery car.

GM executives claimed design duplication with many parts interchangeable between the QQ and the Matiz, and GM China Group stated the two vehicles, "shared remarkably identical body structure, exterior design, interior design and key components."

While some Chery cars are not copies, such as the Pininfarina-designed A3, the QQ may not be the sole Chery model that wears famous-name designs; the Chery Tiggo is criticized for resembling the second generation Toyota RAV4. Other model using the Matiz technology found in the QQ include the closely related QQ6. The Eastar and its derivatives (V4, B12, and B22) have also been considered to be copies of the Daewoo Magnus.

GM lawsuit
After mediation attempts failed, then-GM Daewoo (now known as GM Korea) brought a case against Chery in a Shanghai court, but by 2005 jurisdiction had been moved to the Beijing No.1 Intermediate People's Court.

Around that time Chinese state officials, including a vice-minister of commerce and a vice-director of the State Intellectual Property Office, publicly supported Chery. The Chinese have claimed that GM didn't properly patent their technology. In late 2005 the lawsuit was settled.

Bricklin U.S. court case
An American entrepreneur with past experience importing developing country autos to the U.S., Malcolm Bricklin, sued Chery in 2008 for contracting a different company after previously contracting Bricklin.

See also

List of automobile manufacturers of China
Modiran Vehicle Manufacturing Company

References

External links

 Official international website
 Official China website

 
Truck manufacturers of China
Government-owned companies of China
Electric vehicle manufacturers of China
Companies based in Wuhu
Vehicle manufacturing companies established in 1997
Chinese companies established in 1997
Chinese brands
Car brands